Northcraft Mountain is a summit in Thurston County, Washington, in the United States.

Northcraft Mountain was named after Philip D. Northcraft, a pioneer settler.

References

Mountains of Thurston County, Washington